The Iron Trial, written by Holly Black and Cassandra Clare and published September 9, 2014 by Scholastic Corporation, is the first book in The Magisterium Series.

Plot 
The protagonist of The Magisterium Series is twelve-year-old Callum (Call) Hunt  who was raised by the mage Alastair Hunt, who after the third mage war with 'The Enemy of Death' also known as Constantine Madden, and the death of his wife Sarah at the Cold Massacre, decided to spurn magic and raised up Call to be the same. Call participates in a test to see whether he has sufficient magic to attend the magisterium and train to be a mage using the four elements fire, water, air and earth.

Reception 
The Iron Trial received a starred review from Publishers Weekly, as well as positive reviews from Kirkus.

Kirkus Reviews called the book "[a] promising beginning to a complex exploration of good and evil, as well as friendship’s loyalty."

Maggie Reagan, writing on behalf of Booklist, provided a mixed review, stating,"Expectations are bound to be high for this powerhouse duo’s first cowritten effort, and although it doesn’t quite live up to the authors’ respective works...and there are several missed opportunities, the end offers a few intriguing twists and perspectives that hint at what’s to come in the next installments."

In 2016, the American Library Association named The Iron Trial one of their top ten Quick Picks for Reluctant Young Adult Readers.

References 

 
Children's fantasy novels
Novels by Holly Black
2014 American novels